Slobodna Vlast   is a village in Croatia. It is connected by the D38 highway.

References

Populated places in Osijek-Baranja County